Symphony Number One is the self-titled debut album by Baltimore chamber orchestra Symphony Number One. The album was released in November 2015 to positive reviews. Composer Mark Fromm’s offered the eponymous Symphony No. 1, the first commission by the orchestra. Fromm, a bassoonist, opens the work with an extended bassoon solo. 

The recording was made during Symphony Number One’s debut concert at the Baltimore War Memorial.

Track listing

Personnel
Symphony Number One

Soloists

References

External links 

2015 debut albums
Symphony Number One albums